Ynyswen railway station is a railway station serving the village of Ynyswen in Rhondda Cynon Taf, south Wales. It is located on the Rhondda Line.

It was first opened on this site by British Rail on the former Taff Vale Railway in 1986.

Service

On 20 July 2018, previous franchise operator Arriva Trains Wales announced a trial period of extra Sunday services on the Rhondda Line to Cardiff and Barry Island. This was in response to a survey by Leanne Wood and the success of extra Sunday services on the Merthyr Line and the Rhymney Line.

References

External links

Railway stations in Rhondda Cynon Taf
DfT Category F2 stations
Railway stations opened by British Rail
Railway stations in Great Britain opened in 1986
Railway stations served by Transport for Wales Rail
Treorchy